Exo-1,4-beta-D-glucosaminidase (CsxA, GlcNase, exochitosanase, GlmA, exo-beta-D-glucosaminidase, chitosan exo-1,4-beta-D-glucosaminidase) is an enzyme with systematic name chitosan exo-(1->4)-beta-D-glucosaminidase.! This enzyme catalyses the following chemical reaction

 Hydrolysis of chitosan or chitosan oligosaccharides to remove successive D-glucosamine residues from the non-reducing termini

Chitosan is a partially or totally N-deacetylated chitin derivative that is found in the cell walls of some phytopathogenic fungi .

References

External links 
 

EC 3.2.1